The 2020–21 Országos Bajnokság I (also known as the E.ON Férfi OB I Bajnokság for sponsorship reasons, OB I in short), is going to be the 115th season of top-tier water polo in Hungary.

Team information

The following 16 clubs compete in the OB I during the 2020–21 season:

Personnel and sponsors

Regular season

Standings

Schedule and results
In the table below the home teams are listed on the left and the away teams along the top.

Play-off

Semi-finals

Matches

Szolnoki Dózsa won the series 7–1 with points ratio, and advanced to the Finals.

Statistics

Number of teams by counties and regions

See also
2020 Magyar Kupa

References

External links
 Hungarian Water Polo Federaration 
 Official website of Total Waterpolo
 vlv.hu 
 vizipolo.hu 

Seasons in Hungarian water polo competitions
Hungary
Orszagos Bajnoksag I Men
Orszagos Bajnoksag I Men